Zodarion sardum is a spider species found in Sardinia.

See also 
 List of Zodariidae species

References

External links 

sardum
Spiders of Europe
Spiders described in 1997